Young Royals is a 2021 Swedish television series. 

Young Royals may also refer to:

 Young Royals (book series), a series of children's novels by Carolyn Meyer

See also

 Royal (disambiguation)
 Young (disambiguation)